D.R.C (District Research Center) Nuapada is the only teacher (c.t) training centre of Nuapada district in Odisha State in India.  Its total enrollment is 100.

References

Colleges of education in India
Universities and colleges in Odisha
Nuapada district
Educational institutions in India with year of establishment missing